An election to Kilkenny County Council took place on 10 June 1999 as part of that year's Irish local elections. 26 councillors were elected from five local electoral areas on the system of proportional representation by means of the single transferable vote (PR-STV) for a five-year term of office.

Results by party

Results by Electoral Area

Ballyragget

Callan

Kilkenny

Piltown

Thomastown

External links
 Official website

1999 Irish local elections
1999